The 1959 Kentucky Derby was the 85th running of the Kentucky Derby. The race took place on May 2, 1959.

Full results

 Winning breeder: Captain David H. Wills (U.K.)

References

Further reading

1959
Kentucky Derby
Derby
Kentucky
Kentucky Derby